Chancé Chantele Gatoro is a Congolese beauty pageant titleholder who was chosen as Miss Earth DR Congo 2014 that gives her the right to represent Democratic Republic of the Congo at Miss Earth 2014 in November..

Biography

Early years
Chancè is studying at Utah State University taking up pre-law major with a minor in Political Science. She moved to the United States when she was 11 years old, after living in a refugee camp called Emvepi in Uganda for 3 years.

Chancè believes that "Education is freedom," and was determined to gain her freedom, even if it meant walking 2 hours to school every morning, cleaning people's homes to make enough money to pay for school supplies, and putting her life in danger. Through her own struggle, education has become Chancè’s main focus. She has dedicated her platform in the pageant to Educate the Future of Congo Foundation.

Miss Earth 2014
As being chosen as Miss Earth DR Congo, Chancé Chantele Gatoro will fly to the Philippines in November to compete with almost 100 other candidates to be Alyz Henrich's successor as Miss Earth. To her, winning Miss Earth will bring her one step closer to fulfilling her dream of making the earth a better and safer place to live.

However, as the Miss Earth season came to rise, she was not able to compete for undisclosed reason.

References

People from Kinshasa
Living people
Year of birth missing (living people)